Arsaces II (from ; in  Aršak,  Ašk), was the Arsacid king of Parthia from 217 BC to 191 BC.

Name
 is the Latin form of the Greek Arsákēs, itself from Parthian Aršak. The Old Persian equivalent is Aršaka-.

Biography
Arsaces II succeeded his father Arsaces I in 217 BC. In 209 BC, the energetic Seleucid king Antiochus III the Great recaptured Parthia, which had been previously seized from the Seleucids by Arsaces I and the Parni around 247 BC. Arsaces II sued for peace following his defeat in the Battle of Mount Labus. Prior to this, Antiochus had already occupied the Parthian capital at Hecatompylos, pushing forward to Tagae near Damghan. Following the defeat of Arsaces II at Mount Labus, Antiochus turned westwards into Hyrcania where he occupied Tambrax. The heavily barricaded city of Syrinx was then taken by siege.

In the terms of the peace, Arsaces accepted feudatory status and from then onwards ruled Parthia and Hyrcani as a vassal state of the Seleucids. Antiochus in turn withdrew his troops westwards, where he would subsequently be embroiled in wars with Rome and so would leave the fledgling Parthian kingdom to its own devices. Arsaces II was succeeded by his relative Priapatius in 191 BC.

References

Sources 
 
 
 
 
 
 
 
 

191 BC deaths
2nd-century BC Parthian monarchs
2nd-century BC rulers in Asia
3rd-century BC rulers
Year of birth unknown
3rd-century BC Iranian people
2nd-century BC Iranian people
3rd-century BC Parthian monarchs